Datong is a subdistrict and seat of Datong District, Huainan, Anhui. As of 1997, Datong covers 11 square kilometers and has a population of 30,000. Datong is divided into Yuanwang Community, Zhanhou Community, Jubei Community, Junan Community, and Kuangnan Community.

References 

Township-level divisions of Anhui
Datong District, Huainan